Shahr Deraz or Shahrdaraz or Shahr-e Deraz may refer to:
 Shahr Deraz, Iranshahr
 Shahr-e Deraz, Khash
 Shahr-e Deraz, Mirjaveh